L. bidentata may refer to:

 Leucophytia bidentata, a land snail
 Libnotes bidentata, a crane fly
 Lophocolea bidentata, a liverwort found in the Antipodes Islands